Three separate Brodsky Quartet are known to have existed:
 Brodsky Quartet (Adolph Brodsky Leipzig), established by Adolph Brodsky in Leipzig around 1889
 Brodsky Quartet (Adolph Brodsky Manchester), established by Adolph Brodsky in Manchester around 1895
 Brodsky Quartet, a contemporary quartet formed in 1972, named in honour of Adolph Brodsky.
 Adolph Brodsky, also played second violin for the Hellmesberger Quartet until 1870

String quartets